Johnston is a town in Edgefield County, South Carolina, United States. The population was 2,362 at the 2010 census. It is part of the Augusta, Georgia, metropolitan area. The town's official welcome sign states that it is "Peach Capital of the World".

History
The area has been settled since the mid-1700s. In 1791 as George Washington traveled through the area on his triumphal tour through the country, he stopped at the Lott family plantation, just east of Johnston.

In the late 1860s, the Charlotte, Columbia and Augusta Railroad expanded westward from Columbia to Augusta. Edward Jones Mims, M.D., persuaded William Johnston, president of the railroad, to run the railroad through the  Mims plantation. In return, Dr. Mims agreed to name the new town for Mr. Johnston.

In the early 1900s, the peach industry became successful in this area. Today, the Ridge produces about 60 percent of South Carolina's peaches. Johnston is proclaimed to be the "Peach Capitol of the World."

Geography
Johnston is located in eastern Edgefield County at  (33.831927, -81.802304). South Carolina Highway 23 passes through the center of town as Calhoun Street, leading southwest  to Edgefield, the county seat, and northeast  to Ward. South Carolina Highway 121 (Lee Street) crosses SC 23 at the town center, leading north  to Saluda and south  to Trenton.

Demographics

2000 census 

As of the census of 2000, there were 2,473 people, 923 households, and 635 families residing in the town. The racial makeup of the town was 35.92% White, 62.63% African American, 0.26% Native American, 0.13% Asian, 0.39% from other races, and 0.68% from two or more races. Hispanic or Latino of any race were 1.33% of the population.

There were 923 households, out of which 30.0% had children under the age of 18 living with them, 41.6% were married couples living together, 22.6% had a female householder with no husband present, and 31.2% were non-families. 28.5% of all households were made up of individuals, and 12.4% had someone living alone who was 65 years of age or older. The average household size was 2.53 and the average family size was 3.12.

In the town, the population was spread out, with 27.1% under the age of 18, 9.4% from 18 to 24, 26.7% from 25 to 44, 21.6% from 45 to 64, and 15.2% who were 65 years of age or older. The median age was 36 years. For every 100 females, there were 88.2 males. For every 100 females age 18 and over, there were 82.1 males.

The median income for a household in the town was $25,570, and the median income for a family was $29,531. Males had a median income of $25,521 versus $19,572 for females. The per capita income for the town was $12,671. About 21.2% of families and 23.9% of the population were below the poverty line, including 28.9% of those under age 18 and 20.8% of those age 65 or over.

2010 census
According to the 2010 census, the town had a population of 2,362.  Of which, 1,481 (62.70%) were Black or African American, 845 (35.77%) were White, 18 (0.76%) were two or more races, 11 (0.47%) were some other race, 4 (0.17%) were Asian, 3 (0.13%) were American Indian or Alaska Native.  43 (1.82%) were Hispanic or Latino of any race.

2020 census

As of the 2020 United States census, there were 1,997 people, 811 households, and 531 families residing in the town.

Education
Johnston Elementary School is part of the Edgefield County School District and serves grades K-5. Other schools include Strom Thurmond High School, Johnston-Edgefield- Trenton (JET) Middle School, W.E.Parker Elementary Schools, and a private school called Francis Hugh Wardlaw Academy.

Johnston has a public library, a branch of the ABBE Regional Library System.

References

External links
 The Facebook page for Johnston

Towns in Edgefield County, South Carolina
Towns in South Carolina
Augusta metropolitan area